Connie O'Brien (born October 12, 1946) is a Republican and a former member of the Kansas House of Representatives, representing the 42nd district. A native of Kansas City, Missouri, she served from 2009 to 2017.

O'Brien is currently President of Leavenworth County Republican Women and Vice Chair of the County Party. She previously served as Precinct Committee Woman and President of Kansas for Life.

O'Brien has a BA in Social Studies and Secondary Education from St. Mary College of Leavenworth. She has worked as a teacher in Basehor-Linwood, Leavenworth, and McLouth.

Issue positions
O'Brien's official site lists her priorities as taxes, education, energy, traditional values, immigration, second amendment rights, and eminent domain. The American Conservative Union gave her a lifetime rating of 86%.

Committee Leadership
 Children and Seniors (Chair)

Committee Membership
 Elections
 Social Services Budget
 Local Government
 Joint Committee on Kansas Security

Major donors
The top 5 donors to O'Brien's 2008 campaign:
1. Leavenworth County Republican Central Cmte 	$2,500 	
2. O'Brien, Connie 	$587 	
3. Koch Industries 	$500 	
4. Restore America PAC 	$500 	
5. Kansas Insurance Agents 	$350

2014 Kansas House Elections

References

External links
 Official Website
 Kansas Legislature - Connie O'Brien
 Project Vote Smart profile
 Kansas Votes profile
 Follow the Money campaign contributions:
 2000,  2004, 2008

Republican Party members of the Kansas House of Representatives
People from Leavenworth County, Kansas
Living people
Women state legislators in Kansas
Schoolteachers from Kansas
American women educators
1946 births
21st-century American politicians
21st-century American women politicians
University of Saint Mary alumni